is a Japanese manga artist. He originally worked as an electrical engineer and published dōjinshi under the pen name "Boo", though he wanted to create manga professionally. After retiring from his job, he published his first industry manga called Kokoro Library, which later was adapted into an anime.

Works
@ Home
@ Home: Shimaitachi no Omoi
Dejipara
Kokoro Library
Little Busters!
Magii Per
Pure Marioneeshon

External links
Nobuyuki Takagi's personal website 

1968 births
Manga artists
Living people